The 2012 Arizona Wildcats football team represented the University of Arizona in the 2012 NCAA Division I FBS football season. The Wildcats played at Arizona Stadium in Tucson for the 84th straight year. The 2012 season was Arizona's second in the South Division of the Pac-12 Conference and the first for head coach Rich Rodriguez.

Previous season
Interim head coach Tim Kish led the Cats for the last six games of the 2011 season, replacing eighth-year head coach Mike Stoops, who was fired after starting the season 1–5 (the sole victory coming against FCS Northern Arizona).  Under Stoops, extending back to the 2010 season, the Wildcats had lost 10 consecutive games to FBS opponents, their last victory coming nearly a year earlier on October 30, 2010, against UCLA.  Kish, who started the season as defensive coordinator, went 3–3, leading the team to a record of 4–8 (2–7 Pac-12) on the season.

Three Wildcats from the 2011 squad were drafted to the NFL.  Nick Foles was selected by the Philadelphia Eagles in the third round (88th overall) of the 2012 NFL Draft.  He signed a four-year contract with the team on May 21, 2012.  Juron Criner was selected by the Oakland Raiders in the fifth round (168th overall).  Trevin Wade was selected by the Cleveland Browns in the seventh round (245th overall).

Preseason

Incoming recruiting class and transfers

High School Recruits

Junior College Transfers

Division I Transfers
QB Nick Isham/5-10/185/Hidden Hills, Calif. (Louisiana Tech)

Spring Game
Arizona held its spring Red and Blue game on April 14 at Kino Stadium in Tucson.  The team's offense gained 597 yards over 98 plays, scoring 10 touchdowns.  445 yards and 6 touchdowns came through the air.

Schedule

Arizona plays eight of twelve regular season games at home: all three non-conference games and five of nine Pac-12 games. The Cats play neither Washington State nor California for the second straight season after the league's expansion to 12 teams.

Roster

Depth chart

Returning starters

Offense

Defense

Special teams

Departures

Coaching staff
Rich Rodriguez – Head Coach
Jeff Casteel- Defensive coordinator/LB's Coach
Calvin Magee – Associate head coach, Co-offensive coordinator, RB's
Rod Smith – Co-offensive coordinator/QB's Coach
Robert Anae – Offensive line Coach
Tony Dews – Wide receivers Coach
Tony Gibson – Secondary/safeties coach; Defensive Special Teams
Bill Kirelawich – Defensive line coach
Spencer Leftwich – Tight ends Coach; Offensive Special Teams
David Lockwood – Cornerbacks Coach
Chris Allen – Associate AD, Strength and Conditioning
Mike Parrish – Director of Operations
Charlie Ragle – Assistant DFO
Matt Dudek – On-Campus Recruiting
Parker Whiteman – Director, Skill Development
Frank Davis -Asst. Strength Coach
Matt Caponi -Defensive graduate assistant
Cory Zirbel -Offensive graduate assistant
Billy Kirelawich Operations Coordinator

Game notes and scoring summaries

Toledo

1st quarter scoring: ARIZ – J. Bonano 26-yard field goal; 3–0

2nd quarter scoring: TOL – Alonzo Russell 59-yard pass from Terrance Owens (Jeremiah Detmer kick); 3–7, ARIZ – A. Hill 30-yard pass from M. Scott (J. Bonano kick); 10–7, TOL – David Fluellen 1-yard run (Detmer kick); 10–14

3rd quarter scoring: ARIZ – K. Carey 73-yard run (Bonano kick); 17–14
 
4th quarter scoring: TOL – Detmer 40-yard field goal; 17–17

OT scoring: ARIZ – T. Miller 10-yard pass from Scott (Bonano kick); 24–17

Oklahoma State

Arizona's first ever televised football game on the Pac-12 Network.

South Carolina State

1st quarter scoring:
ARZ- Matt Scott pass complete to Richard Morrison for 15 yards for a TOUCHDOWN. (John Bonano extra point GOOD.) 7–0

2nd quarter scoring: 
ARZ- Matt Scott pass complete to Taimi Tutogi for 14 yards for a TOUCHDOWN. (John Bonano extra point GOOD.) 14–0, ARZ- Ka'Deem Carey rush for 7 yards for a TOUCHDOWN. (John Bonano extra point GOOD.) 21–0, ARZ- Matt Scott rush for 10 yards for a TOUCHDOWN. (John Bonano extra point GOOD.) 28–0

3rd quarter scoring: 
ARZ- Matt Scott pass complete to Dan Buckner for 27 yards for a TOUCHDOWN. (John Bonano extra point GOOD.) 35–0, ARZ-Daniel Jenkins rush for 5 yards for a TOUCHDOWN. (John Bonano extra point GOOD.) 42–0

4th quarter scoring:
ARZ-B.J. Denker pass complete to Sean Willet for 17 yards for a TOUCHDOWN. (John Bonano extra point GOOD.) 49–0, ARZ-Jared Baker rush for 4 yards for a TOUCHDOWN. (John Bonano extra point GOOD.) 56–0

Oregon

1st quarter scoring:  Daryl Hawkins 17 Yd Pass From Marcus Mariota (Rob Beard Kick). Oregon 7–0

2nd quarter scoring:  Rob Beard 27 Yd FG. Oregon 10–0; Rob Beard 41 Yd FG. Oregon 13–0.

3rd quarter scoring: Colt Lyerla 1 Yd Run (Jackson Rice Pass To Rob Beard For 2-Pt Conversion), Oregon 21–0; Bralon Addison 55 Yd Pass From Marcus Mariota (Rob Beard Kick). Oregon 28–0.

4th quarter scoring: Ifo Ekpre-Olomu 54 Yd Interception Return (Rob Beard Kick), Oregon 35–0; Bryan Bennett 8 Yd Run (Rob Beard Kick), Oregon 42–0; Troy Hill 29 Yd Interception Return (Rob Beard Kick). Oregon 49–0.

Oregon State

Arizona leads, 21–13–1.

1st quarter scoring: OSU – Markus Wheaton 2-yard pass from Sean Mannion (Trevor Romaine kick). 7–0

2nd quarter scoring: OSU – Trevor Romaine 30 Yd Field Goal. 10–0, OSU-Tyler Anderson 1 Yd Run (Romaine Kick). 17–0, ARZ-Ka'Deem Carey 1 Yd Run (John Bonano Kick). 17–7

3rd quarter scoring: ARZ – Austin Hill 3 Yd Pass From Matt Scott (Bonano Kick). 17–14, ARZ – Carey 24 Yd Run (Bonano Kick). 21–17, OSU – Storm Woods 1 Yd Run (Romaine Kick). 24–21, ARZ – Dan Buckner 16 Yd Pass From Scott (Bonano Kick). 28–24

4th quarter scoring: OSU – Markus Wheaton 20 Yd Pass From Sean Mannion (Romaine Kick). 31–28, ARZ – Hill 7 Yd Pass From Scott (Bonano Kick). 35–28, OSU – Connor Hamlett 9 Yd Pass From Mannion (Romaine Kick). 38–35

Stanford

1st quarter scoring: STAN – Zach Ertz 11-yard pass from Josh Nunes (Jordan Williamson kick) 
  
2nd quarter scoring: ARIZ – Ka'Deem Carey 13-yard run (John Bonano kick); ARIZ – Bonano 33-yard field goal; STAN – Levine Toilolo 12-yard pass from Nunes (Williamson kick); ARIZ – Bonano 33-yard field goal.

3rd quarter scoring: ARIZ – Carey 1-yard run (Bonano kick); STAN – Nunes 2-yard run (Williamson kick); ARIZ – Austin Hill 12-yard pass from Matt Scott (Bonano kick); STAN – Stepfan Taylor 6-yard (Williamson kick); ARIZ – Hill 17-yard pass from Scott (Scott pass attempt failed ); STAN – Kelsey Young 55-yard run (Nunes pass attempt failed).

4th quarter scoring: ARIZ – Carey 8-yard run (Scott pass to Hill); ARIZ – Terrence Miller 9 yrd pass from Scott (Bonano kick); STAN – Nunes 1 yrd run (Williamson kick); STAN – Nunes 3 yrd run (Williamson kick).

OT (Overtime) Scoring STAN- Stepfan Taylor 21 yrd run.

Washington

1st quarter scoring: UW – Travis Coons kick 43 yard field goal; ARI – David Richards 27 yrd from Matt Scott (John Bonano kick); ARI – Bonano kick 24 yrd field goal

2nd quarter scoring: ARI – Scott 1 yrd run (Bonano kick); ARI – Garic Wharton 33 yrd pass from Scott (Bonano kick); UW – Austin Sefrian Jenkins 6 yard pass from Keith Price (Coons kick); ARI – Austin Hill 53 yrd pass from Scott (Bonano kick); UW – Bishop Sarkey 1 yrd run (Coons kick)

3rd quarter scoring: ARI – Hill 17 yrd pass from Scott (Bonano kick); ARI – Richard Morrison 63 yrd punt return td (Bonano kick)

4th quarter scoring: ARI – Ka'Deem Carey 2 yrd run (Bonano kick)

USC

1st quarter scoring: ARI-Johnny Jackson 8 Yd Pass From Matt Scott (John Bonano Kick) 7–0, ARI-John Bonano 27 Yd Field Goal 10–0

2nd quarter scoring: USC-Xavier Grimble 12 Yd Pass From Matt Barkley (Andre Heidari Kick)	10–7, USC-Marqise Lee 49 Yd Pass From Barkley (Heidari Kick) 10–14, ARI-Bonano 44 Yd Field Goal 13–14, USC-D.J. Morgan 3 Yd Run (Heidari Kick) 13–21

3rd quarter scoring: USC-Lee 44 Yd Pass From Barkley (Heidari Kick) 13–28, ARI-Matt Scott 10 Yd Run (Bonano Kick) 20–28, ARI-Dan Buckner 9 Yd Pass From Scott (Two-Point Run Conversion Failed) 26–28

4th quarter scoring: ARI-Ka'Deem Carey 7 Yd Run (Two-Point Pass Conversion Failed) 32–28, ARI-David Richards 7 Yd Pass From Scott (Bonano Kick) 39–28, USC-Silas Redd 10 Yd Run (Barkley Pass To Lee For Two-Point Conversion) 39–36

UCLA

UCLA's homecoming game. UCLA leads 11–4–2 in Los Angeles (8–4–1 in the Rose Bowl) and Arizona leads 11–8 at Tucson.

1st quarter scoring: UCLA – Johnathan Franklin 37-yard run (Ka'imi Fairbairn kick); UCLA – Brett Hundley 6-yard run (Fairbairn kick); UCLA – Jordan Payton 17-yard pass from Hundley (Fairbairn kick)
 
2nd quarter scoring: UCLA – Damien Thigpen 1-yard run (Fairbairn Kick); ARIZ – John Bonano 28-yard field goal; Jonathan Franklin 2-yard run (Fairbairn Kick); UCLA – Joseph Fauria 1-yard pass from Hundley (Fairbairn kick)
 
3rd quarter scoring: UCLA – Fairbairn 25-yard field goal; ARIZ – Ka'Deem Carey 2-yard -run (Bonano kick); UCLA – Joseph Fauria 28-yard pass from Hundley (Fairbairn kick)
 
4th quarter scoring: UCLA – Steven Manfro 14-yard run (Fairbairn kick); UCLA – Melvin Emesibe 1-yard run (Fairbairn kick)

Colorado

UA's Homecoming Weekend. The referee for this game is Jack Folliard.

1st quarter scoring: COL – Christian Powell 7-yard run (Will Oliver kick); ARI – Ka'Deem Carey 10-yard run (John Bonano kick); COL – Will Oliver 18 yrd field goal

2nd quarter scoring: ARI – Carey 13-yard run (Bonano kick); ARI – Carey 30-yard run (John Bonano kick); COL – Powell 1 yrd-run (Oliver kick); ARI- Dan Buckner 21 yard-pass from B.J. Denker (Bonano kick)

3rd quarter scoring: ARI – Buckner 9 yard-pass from Denker (Bonano kick); ARI – Carey 8-yard run (Bonano kick); ARI – B.J. Denker 10-yard run (Bonano kick)

4th quarter scoring: COL – Donta Abron 10-yard run (Oliver kick); COL – Scott Fernandez 71-yard pass from Connor Wood (Will Oliver kick); ARI – Ka'Deem Carey 3-yard run (Bonano kick)

Utah

1st quarter scoring: ARIZ-John Bonano 44 Yd field goal (3–0)

2nd quarter scoring: UTA-Coleman Petersen 3 Yd Run (Petersen Kick) (3–7); ARIZ- Ka'Deem Carey 1 Yd Run (Bonano Kick) (10–7); ARIZ- Matt Scott 10 Yd Run (Bonano Kick) (17–7); UTA-Jake Murphy 34 Yd Pass From Travis Wilson (Petersen Kick) (14–17)

3rd quarter scoring: UTA- Coleman Petersen 24 Yd (17–17); UTA-DeVonte Christopher 36 Yd Pass From Wilson (Coleman Petersen Kick) (17–24)

4th quarter scoring: ARIZ-Daniel Jenkins 2 Yd Run (Bonano Kick) (24–24); ARIZ-Austin Hill 18 Yd Pass From Scott (John Bonano Kick) (31–24); ARIZ-Bonano 24 Yd Field Goal (34–24)

Arizona State

Arizona wore red helmets for the first time since the 1980 season for their rivalry game with Arizona State.

Nevada (New Mexico Bowl)

Rankings

Statistics

Scores by quarter (all opponents)

Scores by quarter (Pac-12 opponents)

Notes
Arizona Wildcats linebacker Rob Hankins retired due to a concussion injury.

Radio
KCUB 1290 AM Tucson
KHYT 107.5 FM Tucson
KTKT 990 AM Tucson (Spanish)
KFNX 1100 AM Phoenix
KTAN 1420 AM Sierra Vista
KDAP 96.5 FM Douglas, Arizona
KWRQ 102.3 FM Safford, Arizona/Thatcher, Arizona
KIKO 1340 AM Globe, Arizona
KVWM 970 AM Show Low, Arizona/Pinetop-Lakeside, Arizona
XENY 760 Nogales, Sonora (Spanish)

Television
Football Radio Show – KCUB 1290 in Tucson
La Hora de Los Gatos  – KTKT 990 in Tucson

Television Affiliates
Fox Sports Arizona
KWBA Tucson
KGUN Tucson
Comcast Channel 17

References

Arizona
Arizona Wildcats football seasons
New Mexico Bowl champion seasons
2012 in sports in Arizona